Chase Polacek (born June 19, 1989) is an American professional ice hockey player who played for the Peoria Rivermen in the American Hockey League.

Prior to turning professional, Polacek attended the Rensselaer Polytechnic Institute where he played four seasons with the RPI Engineers men's ice hockey team, which competes in the ECAC conference, playing NCAA Division I ice hockey.

Awards and honors

Career statistics

References

External links

Living people
RPI Engineers men's ice hockey players
1989 births
Peoria Rivermen (AHL) players
Ice hockey players from Minnesota
American men's ice hockey forwards
AHCA Division I men's ice hockey All-Americans